William Franklin "Burgie" Burghardt (February 4, 1912 – August 8, 1981) was an American football and basketball coach and former athlete.

Family and early life
Burghardt was born and raised in the small town of Greenfield, Illinois, where his father and grandfather were barbers. He traced his family eight generations to an ancestor who fought in the American Revolution and was related to William Edward Burghardt "W. E. B." Du Bois.

College
Burghardt competed in football and track and field at Eureka College, where he was co-captain of the football team his senior year.  At Eureka, he was on the football team with future president Ronald Reagan, who was two years ahead of him. In 1931, while playing a road trip against another small college in Illinois, a hotel refused to allow Burqhardt and the team's other black player to stay. The coach was angry and decided that the whole team would sleep on the bus. Reagan, Burqhardt later recalled, worried that this would cause the team's performance to suffer and thus humiliate the black players and harm their morale, and suggested instead that the coach tell the team that the hotel did not have enough rooms. Reagan paid for a taxi for Burqhardt and their teammate to Dixon, Illinois, to stay with his parents, Jack and Nelle Reagan, who warmly welcomed them.

In Reagan's 1986 autobiography, Where's the Rest of Me?, he told a story about a racist player on an opposing team who was "filled with hatred and prejudice" and "played dirty" while targeting Burghardt. Though Burghardt was injured, he refused to play dirty and astounded the other team with his strength and skill. At the end of the game, the defeated player turned around to shake Burghardt's hand, telling him he was the greatest human being he had ever met. On Martin Luther King Jr. Day in 1986, President Reagan shared the same story at a school in Washington, D.C. Reagan and Burqhardt remained friends, many decades later.

Coaching and later life
Burqhardt served as the seventh head football coach at the North Carolina College for Negroes — now known as North Carolina Central University — in Durham, North Carolina and he held that position for five seasons, from 1937 until 1941, compiling a record of 22–17–4.  Burghardt was also the head basketball coach at North Carolina Central from to 1937 to 1940, tallying a mark of 47–21.

Burghardt later received his PhD and published articles on health and physical education. In 1971, he was inducted into the Eureka College Athletic Hall of Fame.

References

1912 births
1981 deaths
American football centers
Eureka Red Devils football players
North Carolina Central Eagles football coaches
North Carolina Central Eagles men's basketball coaches
People from Greenfield, Illinois
Coaches of American football from North Carolina
Players of American football from North Carolina
Basketball coaches from Illinois
African-American coaches of American football
African-American players of American football
African-American basketball coaches
20th-century African-American sportspeople